The SGH-T329 (also known as the Stripe) is a camera phone manufactured by Samsung for the T-Mobile service. It is also sold as a prepaid bundle for less than $100 at most retailers.

References

Samsung mobile phones
Mobile phones introduced in 2007